Peter Philipps (June 5, 1835February 17, 1917) was a German American immigrant, blacksmith, and politician.  He was a member of the Wisconsin State Assembly for two terms.

Biography
Philipps was born in Geisfeld, then part of the Rhine Province in the Kingdom of Prussia. The Wisconsin Blue Book lists his birthdate as June 5, 1835, but other sources differ. In 1864, during the fourth year of the American Civil War, he was drafted into the Union Army.  He was enrolled in Company B of the 45th Wisconsin Infantry Regiment, where he served through the end of the war, rising to the rank of sergeant.

He died at his home in Kaukauna, Wisconsin on February 17, 1917.

Political career
Philipps was first a member of the Assembly in 1882. He was later re-elected in 1908. Other positions Philipps held include mayor of Kaukauna. He was a Republican.

References

External links
Geni.com

People from Manitowoc County, Wisconsin
People from Kaukauna, Wisconsin
Republican Party members of the Wisconsin State Assembly
Mayors of places in Wisconsin
People of Wisconsin in the American Civil War
Union Army soldiers
1917 deaths
Burials in Wisconsin
1835 births